The 15 cm Mörser M 80 was a heavy howitzer used by Austria-Hungary in World War I..

The so-called steel-bronze (92% copper bronze strengthened by autofrettage, see Franz von Uchatius) was considered inferior to steel as early as 1870s, but due to the lack of steel industry in Austria it was used for the barrel. The mortar was intended for siege work, although it had carriages suitable for both field and siege duties. The siege carriage was a steel sledge-type and was equipped with a hydraulic braking device to help absorb the recoil forces. Two wheels could be attached to the front of the carriage and a limber attached to the rear for transport. The field carriage relied on chock blocks and a rope brake device to absorb the gun's recoil.

The howitzer could only be loaded at low elevations.

References
 Ortner, M. Christian. The Austro-Hungarian Artillery From 1867 to 1918: Technology, Organization, and Tactics. Vienna, Verlag Militaria, 2007 
 Łukasz Chrzanowski "Artyleria Austro-Węgierska 1860-1890" Przemyśl, Wydawnictwo FORT, 2008, 

World War I howitzers
World War I artillery of Austria-Hungary
150 mm artillery